The South African Railways Class 5A 4-6-2 of 1903 was a steam locomotive from the pre-Union era in the Cape of Good Hope.

In 1903, the Cape Government Railways placed two Karoo Class steam locomotives with a  Pacific type wheel arrangement in passenger service. In 1912, when they were assimilated into the South African Railways, they were renumbered and designated Class 5A.

Design
The Karoo Class of the Cape Government Railways (CGR) was the first tender locomotive with a  Pacific type wheel arrangement to be introduced in Africa. It was the logical development of the CGR 6th Class  Prairie type which later became the Class 6Y on the South African Railways (SAR).

Designed by CGR Chief Locomotive Superintendent H.M. Beatty at the Salt River shops in Cape Town, it was acquired to cope with the increasing weight of passenger trains on the one-in-eighty gradients between Beaufort West and De Aar.

The locomotive had a bar frame, Stephenson valve gear and used saturated steam. At the time, there was a general belief that any appreciable raising of the boiler pitch would result in a top-heavy locomotive.

Manufacturer
In 1903, two of these locomotives were built by Kitson and Company, immediately after building the two 6th Class  Prairie locomotives since their works numbers follow in sequence. They were numbered 903 and 904, but were not allocated class numbers by the CGR and instead became known as the Karoo Class after the region of the Western System which they were designed to work in.

Kitson’s later used the Karoo design as basis for a batch of Pacific type locomotives which it built for the Midland Railway of Western Australia.

Characteristics
One of the most striking features of the Karoo Class was the length of its boiler, which was accentuated by the extended smokebox.

The engine used Richardson slide valves, arranged above the cylinders and actuated by the Stephenson motion and rocker shafts.

South African Railways
When the Union of South Africa was established on 31 May 1910, the three Colonial government railways (CGR, Natal Government Railways and Central South African Railways) were united under a single administration to control and administer the railways, ports and harbours of the Union. Although the South African Railways and Harbours came into existence in 1910, the actual classification and renumbering of all the rolling stock of the three constituent railways were only implemented with effect from 1 January 1912.

In 1912, these two locomotives were renumbered 721 and 722 and designated Class 5A on the SAR.

Service
In service, the Class 5A locomotives performed excellently. Beatty's annual report for 1905 stated that they ran  before a failure occurred, that failure being a hot box. They spent most of their working lives in the Karoo until they were displaced by larger locomotives. They were then placed in suburban service working out of Cape Town, where they remained until they were withdrawn from service c. 1940.

Illustration

References

1290
1290
4-6-2 locomotives
2′C1′ n2 locomotives
Kitson locomotives
Cape gauge railway locomotives
Railway locomotives introduced in 1903
1903 in South Africa
Scrapped locomotives